Stergios Tsoukas (born 1936) is a Greek weightlifter. He competed in the men's middle heavyweight event at the 1968 Summer Olympics.

References

External links
 

1936 births
Living people
Greek male weightlifters
Olympic weightlifters of Greece
Weightlifters at the 1968 Summer Olympics
Sportspeople from Kastoria